The Roman Catholic Archdiocese of Taiyuan is an archdiocese located in the city of Taiyuan (Shanxi) in China.

History
 June 17, 1890: Established as Apostolic Vicariate of Northern Shansi 山西北境 from the Apostolic Vicariate of Shansi 山西
 December 3, 1924: Renamed as Apostolic Vicariate of Taiyuanfu 太原府
 April 11, 1946: Promoted as Metropolitan Archdiocese of Taiyuan 太原
 August 28, 2022: The  (北寒天主堂) in Taiyuan was demolished by the local authority.

Leadership
 Archbishops of Taiyuan (Roman rite)
 Archbishop Paul Meng Zhuyou (2013–present)
 Archbishop Sylvester Li Jian-tang (1994–2013)
 Archbishop Benedict Bonaventura Zhang Xin (1981–1994)
 Archbishop Domenico Luca Capozi, O.F.M. (李路加) (April 11, 1946 – 1983)

 Vicars Apostolic of Taiyuanfu 太原府 (Roman Rite)
 Bishop Domenico Luca Capozi, O.F.M. (李路加) (later Archbishop) (January 12, 1940 – April 11, 1946)
 Bishop Agapito Augusto Fiorentini, O.F.M. (鳳朝瑞) (December 3, 1924 – 1938)

 Vicars Apostolic of Northern Shansi 山西北境 (Roman Rite)
 Bishop Agapito Augusto Fiorentini, O.F.M. (鳳朝瑞) (July 7, 1916 – December 3, 1924)
 Bishop Eugenio Massi, O.F.M. (希賢) (February 15, 1910 – July 7, 1916)
 Bishop Agapito Augusto Fiorentini, O.F.M. (鳳朝瑞) (March 16, 1902 – November 18, 1909)
 Saint Bishop Gregorio Maria Grassi, O.F.M. (艾士杰) (June 17, 1890 – July 19, 1900)

Suffragan dioceses
 Datong 大同
 Fenyang 汾陽
 Hongdong 洪洞
 Lu’an 潞安
 Shuozhou 朔州
 Yuci 榆次

References

Sources

 GCatholic.org
 Catholic Hierarchy

Roman Catholic dioceses in China
Religious organizations established in 1890
Roman Catholic dioceses and prelatures established in the 19th century
Religion in Shanxi